Interleukin-18 (IL-18), also known as interferon-gamma inducing factor is a protein which in humans is encoded by the IL18 gene. The protein encoded by this gene is a proinflammatory cytokine. Many cell types, both hematopoietic cells and non-hematopoietic cells, have the potential to produce IL-18. It was first described in 1989 as a factor that induced interferon-γ (IFN-γ) production in mouse spleen cells. Originally, IL-18 production was recognized in Kupffer cells, liver-resident macrophages. However, IL-18 is constitutively expressed in non-hematopoietic cells, such as intestinal epithelial cells, keratinocytes, and endothelial cells. IL-18 can modulate both innate and adaptive immunity and its dysregulation can cause autoimmune or inflammatory diseases.

Processing 
Cytokines usually contain the signal peptide which is necessary for their extracellular release. In this case, IL18 gene, similar to other IL-1 family members, lacks this signal peptide. Furthermore, similar to IL-1β, IL-18 is produced as a biologically inactive precursor. IL-18 gene encodes for a 193 amino acids precursor, first synthesized as an inactive 24 kDa precursor with no signal peptide, which accumulates in cell cytoplasm. Similarly to IL-1β, the IL-18 precursor is processed intracellularly by caspase 1 in the NLRP3 inflammasome into its mature biologically active molecule of 18 kDa.

Receptor and signaling 
IL-18 receptor consists of the inducible component IL-18Rα, which binds the mature IL-18 with low affinity and the constitutively expressed co-receptor IL-18Rβ. IL-18 binds the ligand receptor IL-18Rα, inducing the recruitment of IL-18Rβ to form a high affinity complex, which signals through the toll/interleukin-1 receptor (TIR) domain. This signaling domain recruits MyD88 adaptor protein that activates proinflammatory programs and NF-κB pathway. The activity of IL-18 can be suppressed by extracellular interleukin 18 binding protein (IL-18BP) that binds soluble IL-18 with a higher affinity than IL-18Rα thus prevents IL-18 binding to IL-18 receptor. IL-37 is another endogenous factor that suppresses the action of IL-18. IL-37 has high homology with IL-18 and can bind to IL-18Rα, which then forms a complex with IL-18BP, thereby reduces the activity of IL-18. Moreover, IL-37 binds to single immunoglobulin IL-1 receptor related protein (SIGIRR), also known as IL-1R8 or TIR8, which forms a complex with IL-18Rα and induces an anti-inflammatory response. The IL-37/IL-18Rα/IL-1R8 complex activates the STAT3 signaling pathway, decreases NF-κB and AP-1 activation and reduces IFNγ production. Thus, IL-37 and IL-18 have opposing roles and IL-37 can modulate pro-inflammatory effects of IL-18.

Function 

IL-18 belongs to the IL-1 superfamily and is produced mainly by macrophages but also other cell types, stimulates various cell types and has pleiotropic functions. IL-18 is a proinflammatory cytokine that facilitates type 1 responses. Together with IL-12, it induces cell-mediated immunity following infection with microbial products like lipopolysaccharide (LPS). IL-18 in combination with IL12 acts on CD4, CD8 T cells and NK cells to induce IFNγ production, type II interferon that plays an important role in activating the macrophages or other cells. The combination of this IL-18 and IL-12 has been shown to inhibit IL-4 dependent IgE and IgG1 production and enhance IgG2a production in B cells. Importantly, without IL-12 or IL-15, IL-18 does not induce IFNγ production, but plays an important role in the differentiation of naive T cells into Th2 cells and stimulates mast cells and basophils to produce IL-4, IL-13, and chemical mediators such as histamine.

Clinical significance 

Apart from its physiological role, IL-18 is also able to induce severe inflammatory reactions, which suggests its role in certain inflammatory disorders such as the chronic inflammation and the autoimmune disorders.

Endometrial IL-18 receptor mRNA and the ratio of IL-18 binding protein to interleukin 18 are significantly increased in adenomyosis patients in comparison to normal people, indicating a role in its pathogenesis.

IL-18 has been implicated as an inflammatory mediator of Hashimoto's thyroiditis, the most common  cause of autoimmune hypothyroidism.  IL-18 is up regulated by interferon-gamma.

IL-18 has also been found to increase the Alzheimer's disease-associated amyloid-beta production in human neuron cells.

IL-18 is also associated with urine protein excretion what means that it can be marker for assessing the progression of diabetic nephropathy. This interleukin was also significantly elevated in patients with microalbuminuria and macroalbuminuria when it was compared with healthy people and patients with diabetes which have normoalbuminuria.

IL-18 is involved in the neuroinflammatory response after intracerebral hemorrhage.

The single-nucleotide polymorphism (SNP) IL18 rs360719, a genetic variant of the Interleukin-18 (IL-18) gene, revealed a probable role in determining the susceptibility to systemic lupus erythematosus and to be a possible "key factor in the expression of the IL18 gene."

References

Further reading

External links 
 

Interleukins